Involuticeras is a perisphinctoid ammonite belonging to the Aulacostephanininae from the Upper Jurassic of Europe and possibly Mexico.  The shell is involute, moderately compressed, with a rounded and ribbed venter.  The genus is similar in general form to Aulacostephanus and Epicephalites.

References

Treatise on Invertebrate Paleontology, Part L,(1957), Mesozoic Ammonoidea, p. L324.

Jurassic ammonites
Ammonitida genera
Perisphinctidae
Ammonites of Europe